A danger dog is a hot dog that has been wrapped in bacon and deep-fried.  It is served on a hot dog bun with various toppings.  Also known as a bacon-wrapped hot dog, it was first sold by street vendors in Mexico. Its origin has been placed in either Tijuana or Hermosillo, where it was originally served in a bolillo instead of a hot dog bun.  These dogs are sold from carts that are ubiquitous along Avenida Revolución and the area surrounding the border in Tijuana, as well as the bar district in Ensenada.  

Sonoran dogs are now sold by street vendors and in restaurants and sporting venues in urban areas in the United States such as San Diego, Los Angeles, San Francisco, and New York City.

The term "sonoran dog" originates from this form of hot dog's origins in the
Sonoran region of Mexico.

Francheezie
In Chicago, there is a variation of the danger dog called the francheezie. This is an all-beef hot dog wrapped in bacon and deep fried, with melted Cheddar or American cheese (or Velveeta). Usually the hot dog is split and filled with cheese before being deep fried. Alternatively, the cheese may be added as a topping after frying. The francheezie is served on a bun. It is typically sold by restaurants rather than street vendors.

Bacon-wrapped

In Los Angeles, the danger dog is known as the bacon-wrapped hot dog. Vendors can be found cooking them on a stainless-steel baking tray over Sterno heat sources outside of bars, concerts, sporting events, and other late night establishments. The bacon-wrapped usually consists of a bacon-wrapped hot dog, grilled onions, bell peppers, ketchup, mustard, mayonnaise, and grilled jalapeño peppers. After a public campaign in 2010, the L.A. City Council proclaimed the bacon-wrapped to be the official hot dog of Los Angeles.

Jersey breakfast dog
In New Jersey and elsewhere on the East Coast, there is a variation called the Jersey breakfast dog. This is a bacon-wrapped, deep-fried hot dog with melted cheese, on top of a fried or scrambled egg.

Mission dog
In San Francisco, the bacon-wrapped hot dog is also called a Mission dog after the Mission District, the area of the city where it was originally sold. It is typically served with grilled onions, mustard, ketchup, mayonnaise, and jalapeños.

Texas Tommy
The Texas Tommy is found in Philadelphia and elsewhere in eastern Pennsylvania. Like a francheezie, it is a hot dog that is split and filled with cheese before being wrapped with bacon. The Texas Tommy can be either deep-fried, broiled, or grilled.

See also

 List of hot dogs

References

Hot dogs
Bacon
Culture in Tijuana